Acaulospora is a genus of fungi in the family Acaulosporaceae. Species in this genus are widespread in distribution, and form arbuscular mycorrhiza and vesicles in roots.

Species list
 A. alpina
 A. appendicula
 A. bireticulata
 A. brasiliensis
 A. capsicula
 A. cavernata
 A. colliculosa
 A. colombiana
 A. colossica
 A. delicata
 A. denticulata
 A. dilatata
 A. elegans
 A. entreriana
 A. excavata
 A. foveata
 A. gedanensis
 A. gerdemannii
 A. kentinensis
 A. koskei
 A. lacunosa
 A. laevis
 A. longula
 A. mellea
 A. morrowiae
 A. myriocarpa
 A. nicolsonii
 A. nivalis
 A. paulinae
 A. polonica
 A. rehmii
 A. rugosa
 A. scrobiculata
 A. sieverdingii
 A. spinosa
 A. splendida
 A. sporocarpia
 A. taiwania
 A. terricola
 A. thomii
 A. trappei
 A. tuberculata
 A. walkeri

External links
 International Culture Collection of Vesicular Arbuscular Mycorrhizal Fungi

Diversisporales
Taxa named by James Trappe